The Waihāhā River is a river of the Waikato Region of New Zealand's North Island. It flows from its origins in several streams west of Lake Taupo, the most important of which are the Mangatu and Waitaia streams, which have their headwaters in the Hauhungaroa Range.

See also
List of rivers of New Zealand

References

Taupō District
Rivers of Waikato
Rivers of New Zealand